The Austro Engine AE75R is an Austrian aircraft engine, that was designed and produced by Austro Engine of Wiener Neustadt for use in ultralight aircraft.

As of March 2018 the engine was no longer advertised for sale on the company website.

Design and development
The AE75R is a twin-rotor four-stroke,  displacement, air and liquid-cooled, gasoline Wankel engine design, with a helical gear mechanical gearbox reduction drive with reduction ratio of 2.96:1. It employs dual capacitor discharge ignition and produces  at 7000 rpm, with a compression ratio of 9.5:1.

Specifications (IAE75R)

See also

References

External links

Austro Engine aircraft engines
Aircraft Wankel engines